The nineteenth edition of the South American Championship in football was held in Buenos Aires, Argentina from 12 January to 10 February. This tournament, an extra edition with no trophy handed to the winners, is considered official by CONMEBOL.

The participating countries were Argentina, Brazil, Bolivia, Chile, Paraguay, and Uruguay.

Colombia, Ecuador, and Peru withdrew from the tournament.

Venues

Squads

Final round
Each team played against each of the other teams. Two points were awarded for a win, one point for a draw and zero points for a defeat.

Result

Goal scorers
7 Goals
  José M. Medina

5 goals

  Ángel Labruna
  Norberto Méndez
  Zizinho

4 goals
  Juan Villalba

3 goals

  Heleno
  Araya
  Atilio Cremaschi

2 goals

  Adolfo Pedernera
  Juan C. Salvini
  Miguel Peredo
  Chico
  Jair

1 goal

  Vicente De la Mata
  Félix Loustau
  Rinaldo Martino
  Zenón González
  Norival
  Juan Alcántara
  Santiago Salfate
  Delfín Benítez Cáceres
  Alejandrino Genés
  Albino Rodríguez
  Porfirio Rolón
  José García
  José A. Vázquez
  Juan P. Riephoff
  Raúl Schiaffino

Own goal
  Doroteo Coronel (for Bolivia)

External links
 South American Championship 1946 at RSSSF

 
1946
1946
1946 in South American football
1946 in Argentine football
1946 in Brazilian football
1946 in Uruguayan football
1946 in Chilean sport
1946 in Bolivian sport
1946
January 1946 sports events in South America
February 1946 sports events in South America
1946
1940s in Buenos Aires
Sport in Avellaneda